Zero Bridge is a 2008 Indian drama film written and directed by Tariq Tapa and starring Mohamad Imran Tapa, Taniya Khan and Ali Mohammad Dar.  It is Tapa's feature directorial debut.

Cast
Mohamad Imran Tapa
Taniya Khan
Ali Mohammad Dar
Owaise Qayoom Bhat
Burhan Qadfir
Afrooza Langoo

Release
The film premiered at the 2008 Venice Film Festival.

Reception
The film has a 77% rating on Rotten Tomatoes.  Scott Tobias of The A.V. Club graded the film a C+.  Bill Weber of Slant Magazine awarded the film two and a half stars out of four.

The Hollywood Reporter gave the film a positive review and wrote, "Rough hewn neo-realist drama from India has its sociological fascinations."

Nominations
At the 25th Independent Spirit Awards, Tapa was nominated for the Someone to Watch Award and the film was nominated for the Independent Spirit John Cassavetes Award.

References

External links
 
 

2000s Urdu-language films
Kashmiri-language films
Indian drama films
2008 drama films
2008 films